Summerfield is a village in St. Clair County, Illinois, United States. The population was 451 at the 2010 census.

Geography
Summerfield is located at  (38.596948, -89.751171).

Demographics

As of the census of 2010, there were 451 people, 161 households, and 123 families residing in the village. The racial makeup of the village was 96.61% White, 1.27% African American, 0.85% Native American, 0.21% Asian, 0.85% from other races, and 0.21% from two or more races. Hispanic or Latino of any race were 2.12% of the population.

There were 161 households, out of which 36.0% had children under the age of 18 living with them, 60.2% were married couples living together, 11.8% had a female householder with no husband present, and 23.6% were non-families. 17.4% of all households were made up of individuals, and 6.8% had someone living alone who was 65 years of age or older. The average household size was 2.93 and the average family size was 3.20.

In the village, the population was spread out, with 32.2% under the age of 18, 6.8% from 18 to 24, 30.3% from 25 to 44, 23.1% from 45 to 64, and 7.6% who were 65 years of age or older. The median age was 33 years. For every 100 females, there were 109.8 males. For every 100 females age 18 and over, there were 105.1 males.

The median income for a household in the village was $42,031, and the median income for a family was $42,500. Males had a median income of $27,813 versus $18,472 for females. The per capita income for the village was $13,283. About 5.8% of families and 6.7% of the population were below the poverty line, including none of those under age 18 and 22.2% of those age 65 or over.

Notable persons

 Friedrich Hecker, German lawyer, politician and revolutionary
 Wally Rehg, outfielder for four Major League Baseball teams, was born in Summerfield

References

Villages in St. Clair County, Illinois
Villages in Illinois